Kediri International Airport is an airport currently under construction at Kediri, which is situated approximately 120 kilometers southwest of Surabaya city, and will serve Kediri, Blitar and Nganjuk regency of East Java, Indonesia. The goal to develop the airport was made to boost economic growth in the southern part of East Java province, as well as to supplement the operation of Juanda International Airport. The airport is expected to be operational by 2023 and could become an international airport in future. 

Kediri Airport would be the first-ever in Indonesia to be fully funded by the private sector and will be developed in three phases under a public-private partnership scheme with a concession period of 30 to 50 years.

Groundbreaking has been done through virtual communication due to Covid-19 on April 15, 2020. The airport will have a land area of about 372 hectares. The runway will be built with a length of 3,300 meters and can accommodate wide-body aircraft Class 4E. The airport is expected to accommodate around 1.5 million passengers at an initial run with a maximum of 10 million passengers at the ultimate time.

Development
The construction project of Kediri Airport is one of the National Strategic Project (PSN) of Indonesia. Kediri-based cigarette maker PT Gudang Garam is investing Rp10 trillion (US$709.22 million) to develop the airport. The company also owned an airline, namely Surya Air and planned the airport as the hub of that airline. After completion the airport will be operated by PT Angkasa Pura II.

See also

Kediri (city)

References

Airports in East Java